The  Nippon Professional Baseball season

Standings

See also
Japanese Baseball League
1949 All-American Girls Professional Baseball League season
1949 Major League Baseball season

References

Nippon